Howard Dell (born 14 April 1962) is a Canadian former bobsledder and Canadian football player. He competed in the four man event at the 1988 Winter Olympics. Dell played for the Toronto Argonauts and Winnipeg Blue Bombers of the Canadian Football League in 1990 and 1991 as a wide receiver and defensive back.

References

External links
 
 

1962 births
Living people
Canadian male bobsledders
Olympic bobsledders of Canada
Bobsledders at the 1988 Winter Olympics
Sportspeople from Toronto
Canadian football people from Toronto
Players of Canadian football from Ontario
McMaster Marauders football players
Toronto Argonauts players
Winnipeg Blue Bombers players
Canadian football wide receivers
Canadian football defensive backs
Canadian male actors